Michèle Rubirola (born 28 July 1956) is a French politician who served as Mayor of Marseille from 4 July to 21 December 2020. A physician by occupation, she succeeded Jean-Claude Gaudin, who chose not to run for reelection to a fifth term in office and endorsed his long-term deputy Martine Vassal, who lost the mayorship race following the municipal election in June 2020. A member of Europe Ecology – The Greens (EELV), Rubirola is the first female Mayor of Marseille. Her grandparents came from Catalonia and Naples.

On 15 December 2020 she announced her resignation from the mayorship for health reasons. She was succeeded by First Deputy Mayor Benoît Payan of the Socialist Party, whom she succeeded as First Deputy Mayor on 21 December 2021. Rubirola previously held a seat in the Departmental Council of Bouches-du-Rhône from 2015 to 2021, elected in the canton of Marseille-1 alongside Payan.

References 

1956 births
Living people
French people of Italian descent
French people of Spanish descent
21st-century French women politicians
Mayors of Marseille
Aix-Marseille University alumni
The Greens (France) politicians
Europe Ecology – The Greens politicians
20th-century French physicians
20th-century French women
Women mayors of places in France
Physicians from Marseille
Departmental councillors (France)
French city councillors